Alestopetersius bifasciatus is a species of African tetras found in Lake Tumba and the Tshuapa River with related rivers in the middle Congo River basin in the Democratic Republic of the Congo.

References

Paugy, D., 1984. Characidae. p. 140-183. In J. Daget, J.-P. Gosse and D.F.E. Thys van den Audenaerde (eds.) Check-list of the freshwater fishes of Africa (CLOFFA). ORSTOM, Paris and MRAC, Tervuren. Vol. 1.

Alestidae
Fish of Africa
Taxa named by Max Poll
Fish described in 1967